Rogi  is a village in the administrative district of Gmina Lubniewice, within Sulęcin County, Lubusz Voivodeship, in western Poland. 

The village has a population of 70.

References

Rogi